William Harrington Leahy (October 27, 1904 – May 12, 1986) was a rear admiral in the United States Navy, and the son of William D. Leahy, President Franklin D. Roosevelt's military chief of staff during World War II.

Biography
Leahy was born on October 27, 1904 in San Francisco, California. His father was Fleet Admiral William D. Leahy. Leahy married Elizabeth Marbury Beale on July 23, 1927 and had two children, Louise Harrington (named after her grandmother) and Robert Beale.

After attending Sidwell Friends School he completed his undergraduate study at the United States Naval Academy; he also received a master's degree in naval architecture from MIT and did further work in management at Harvard Business School.

Leahy served as Senior Design Officer, Landing Craft Construction, and later Head of the Landing Craft Section, Bureau of Ships, from November 1942 to October 1945 and received Legion of Merit for his service. As a Rear Admiral, he was Shipyard Commander, Norfolk Navy Yard between 30 June 1958 and 29 June 1960.

Leahy was a member of the Society of Naval Architects and Marine Engineers and the Newcomen Society.

He died on May 12, 1986 in Chevy Chase, Maryland and is buried with Elizabeth and his parents at Arlington National Cemetery.

Career
Leahy graduated from the United States Naval Academy in 1927. Later in his career he served as commander of the Norfolk Naval Shipyard from 1958 to 1960. He retired from the U.S. Navy on June 1, 1961.

References

1904 births
1986 deaths
People from San Francisco
United States Naval Academy alumni
United States Navy admirals
Massachusetts Institute of Technology alumni
Military personnel from California
United States Navy personnel of World War II
Recipients of the Legion of Merit
Burials at Arlington National Cemetery